The 1901–02 Purdue Boilermakers men's basketball team compiled a 10-3 record, led by returning team captain Wallace Reimann. The team averaged 39 points per game and held their opponents to 18.9 points per game.  By sweeping their Indiana opponents of Butler, Indiana, and Indiana State Normal, they claimed the state championship for the second year in a row.   Two particular features of this season were an extended road trip through the South, and a game against Yale. Starting forward Harry Cook died mid-season on February 27, 1902.

Roster

Games

References 
 Purdue University, Debris (yearbook), 1902, http://earchives.lib.purdue.edu/cdm/ref/collection/debris/id/11522

Purdue Boilermakers men's basketball seasons
Purdue